Socrates is a 1971 Spanish-Italian-French television film directed by Roberto Rossellini. The film is an adaptation of several Plato dialogues, including The Apology, Euthyphro, Crito, and Phaedo.

Plot
The film tells the personal and historical events of the last period of the life of Socrates, the famous Athenian philosopher. The historical background is the period of the decay of the Greek Polis and of the democracy of Athens: the opening scene shows the demolition of the city walls by the Spartans, now victors of the Peloponnesian War, with the subsequent establishment of the Government of the Thirty Tyrants (404 BC).

The city is in turmoil for the defeat and humiliation suffered, as well as for the organization of military counter-moves for the liberation (which will lead to the fall of the Thirty the year following the establishment of the Regime). In this context it is introduced the character of Socrates, now seventy years old and engaged every day in his philosophical research with a large following of young people.

During the film many excerpts from some of Plato's famous Dialogues are presented, including Hippias major, Euthyphron, Republic, Crito, Socrates' Apology and Phaedo. There are also some explicit quotations, by a detractor of Socrates, of The Clouds, the comedy of Aristophanes in which the philosopher is described as a scoundrel, expert in sophisms and rhetoric, able to always make the unjust cause just.

These references contribute to outline the thought and philosophy of Socrates: the awareness of one's ignorance as a necessary prerequisite for the search for truth; the Socratic method that uses dialogue as a means for philosophical investigation; irony and maieutics as moments of the dialogue itself; the importance of virtue in achieving happiness; contempt for money, power and other material values; the opposition to the Sophists and their abuse of rhetoric as an instrument to flaunt a false wisdom; the criticism of the validity of the writings.

In the background is the reconstruction of his family and economic situation: the philosopher lives in poverty with his three children and his wife, Xanthippe, a shrewish woman with hysterical attitudes, continually critical of her husband. who does not provide for the maintenance of the family and the house, intent only on his philosophical investigation which she considered a useless waste of time.

The aforementioned historical and political events, however, determine the decay of democracy in Athens even after the expulsion of the Thirty Tyrants. The Athenians, upset by the events, are less and less democratic, mentally open and tolerant with those who show themselves critical in comparisons of official culture and traditional values. Socrates pays the highest price for this climate of tension and insecurity, as he is unjustly accused and condemned for having, according to the accuser Meletus, corrupted the youth with his "teachings" and despised the gods and the traditional religion of Athens.

The defense of Socrates, presented as in the "Apology" written by Plato, is clear, linear and calm, but it is not enough to avoid capital punishment in the form of suicide. He himself rejects any other type of sentence (such as prison, exile or the payment of a fine), provocatively proposing, as a just "punishment", to be hosted at the Prytaneion as a worthy citizen, and accepting the verdict of his judges. He also refuses the possibility offered to him by his friends to escape from prison before the execution of the sentence, faithful to his philosophical convictions whose pillars are justice and unconditional respect for the laws.

The film ends with the suicide of the philosopher, who is forced to drink a poison obtained from hemlock and who, until his last breath, does not stop reasoning and talking with his friends about life, death and the immortality of the soul.

Production
Rossellini wanted to make a film on Socrates many years before starting production. He would joke that like the Athenian philosopher he failed to make money. Location shooting could not take place in Greece because of the dictatorship so the movie was filmed in Patones Arriba, a town in Spain that was dressed up to look like Athens. Most of the script is lifted directly from de la Rochefoucauld's translations of Plato dialogues, particularly the Apology. Christian symbolism is also used heavily in this film. Socrates refers to his followers as his "disciples" and they all drink from a chalice in a scene heavy with symbolism.

Cast
Jean Sylvère as Socrates
 as Xanthippe, Socrates' wife
Giuseppe Mannajuolo as Apollodorus, Socrates' disciple
Ricardo Palacios as Crito, Socrates' disciple
Antonio Medina as Plato, Socrates' disciple
Julio Morales as Antisthenes, Socrates' disciple
Emilio Miguel Hernández as Meletus, Socrates' accuser
Emilio Hernández Blanco as Ipperide
Manuel Angel Egea as Cebes, Socrates' disciple
Jesús Fernández as Cristobulus, Socrates' disciple
Eduardo Puceiro as Simmias, Socrates' disciple
José Renovales as Phaedo, Socrates' disciple
Gonzalo Tejel as Anytus, supporter of Socrates' accuser
Antonio Requena as Ermete
Roberto Cruz as an old man
Francisco Sanz as an actor
Antonio Alfonso as Euthyphro, Socrates' disciple
Juan Margallo as Critias, Socrates' disciple
Román Ariznavarreta as Callicles, Socrates' disciple
Francisco Calalá as Lysias, Socrates' disciple
Adolfo Thous as Ippio
Bernardo Ballester as Teofrasto
Jean-Dominique de La Rochefoucauld as Phaedrus, Socrates' disciple
César Bonet as Priest
Jerzy Radlowsky as Giullare
Pedro Estecha as Focione
Rafael de la Rosa as Thrasybulus, Socrates' disciple
Simón Arriaga as Servant bringing hemlock
Iván Almagro as Hermogenes, Socrates' disciple
Constant Rodriguez as Aristefo
Stefano Charelli as Efigene
Luis Alonso Gulias as Echino
Jesus A. Gordon as Lamprocles, Socrates' son
José Luis Ortega as younger son of Socrates
Elio Seraffini as Priest

References

External links

essay on Socrates by Frank Miller
Socrates at CineDataBase

1971 films
1971 drama films
1970s biographical drama films
1970s historical drama films
Italian biographical drama films
French biographical drama films
1970s Italian-language films
Spanish biographical drama films
Biographical films about philosophers
Cultural depictions of Socrates
Cultural depictions of Plato
Films about philosophy
Films set in ancient Greece
Films set in the 4th century BC
Films set in Athens
Films set in Greece
Films directed by Roberto Rossellini
Films scored by Mario Nascimbene
Films shot in the Community of Madrid
1971 in Italian television
1970s Italian films
1970s French films